Kerema may be 

Tairuma language 
Nisa language